Takamatua, with an initial European name of German Bay, is a small town situated in Akaroa Harbour on Banks Peninsula in New Zealand. The main road to Akaroa (State Highway 75) passes through this locality.

History 
At the time of French settlement in August 1840 in Akaroa, a small number of German families settled in this bay. Five German men, four of them single,  chose to have land in Takamatua rather than Akaroa. The men were Breitmeyer, Hahn, Hettich, Waeckerle, Walther and Woll.  The bay was named German Bay up until 1916 when the residents called on the Minister for Internal Affairs, George Warren Russell, to change the name to Takamatua, as a patriotic reaction to World War I. The German Bay Dairy Co-operative Factory was established in 1893. The Factory's cheese won first prize at the Dunedin Agricultural Show in 1901 and 1902.

Demographics
It is part of the statistical area of Akaroa Harbour. 

Takamatua had a population of 111 at the 2018 New Zealand census, a decrease of 24 people (-17.8%) since the 2013 census, and unchanged since the 2006 census. There were 45 households. There were 57 males and 54 females, giving a sex ratio of 1.06 males per female. The median age was 61.8 years (compared with 37.4 years nationally), with 12 people (10.8%) aged under 15 years, 3 (2.7%) aged 15 to 29, 54 (48.6%) aged 30 to 64, and 42 (37.8%) aged 65 or older.

Ethnicities were 94.6% European/Pākehā, 10.8% Māori, 0.0% Pacific peoples, 5.4% Asian, and 2.7% other ethnicities (totals add to more than 100% since people could identify with multiple ethnicities).

Although some people objected to giving their religion, 43.2% had no religion, 37.8% were Christian, 2.7% were Buddhist and 5.4% had other religions.

Of those at least 15 years old, 18 (18.2%) people had a bachelor or higher degree, and 18 (18.2%) people had no formal qualifications. The median income was $28,600, compared with $31,800 nationally. The employment status of those at least 15 was that 36 (36.4%) people were employed full-time, 24 (24.2%) were part-time, and 0 (0.0%) were unemployed.

References

Further reading 
Dykes, G.A. A History of the German Bay / Takamatua School 1876 - 1936  (history of both the school and the wider Takamatua community)

Banks Peninsula
Populated places in Canterbury, New Zealand
Bays of Canterbury, New Zealand